John Tierney (born 9 December 1951) is an Irish Social Democratic and Labour Party (SDLP) politician who served as a Member of the Legislative Assembly (MLA) for Foyle from 1998 to 2003.

Early life and career 
Born in Derry, Tierney worked as a tool setter before joining the Social Democratic and Labour Party (SDLP).  He was elected to Derry City Council in 1981, and served as the Mayor of Derry in 1984.  In 1996, Tierney was elected to the Northern Ireland Forum for Foyle, and he held his seat at the 1998 Northern Ireland Assembly election.  He stood down from the Council in 2001, while the following year, he became the whip of the SDLP group on the Assembly.

Tierney stood down from the Assembly at the 2003 election, and in 2007 was co-opted back on to Derry City Council.

References

1951 births
Living people
Mayors of Derry
Members of the Northern Ireland Forum
Northern Ireland MLAs 1998–2003
Social Democratic and Labour Party MLAs
Politicians from Derry (city)